Washington Tseko Isaac Mafanya is a South African politician and a Member of Parliament (MP) for the Economic Freedom Fighters party.

Political career
Mafanya stood as an EFF parliamentary candidate in the 2019 national elections, and was subsequently elected to the National Assembly and sworn in on 22 May 2019.

He became a member of the  Portfolio Committee on Police on 27 June 2019. Mafanya served on the committee until 6 May 2020, when he moved to the  Portfolio Committee on Defence and Military Veterans.

References

Living people
Year of birth missing (living people)
Economic Freedom Fighters politicians
Members of the National Assembly of South Africa
21st-century South African politicians